"Our Alma Mater" is the alma mater of The College of William & Mary. It was written by James Southall Wilson, a William & Mary alumnus from the class of 1904.  Usually, only the first and fourth verses are sung. The song is set to the tune of Annie Lisle, which is used in the alma mater songs of many other colleges, most notably Cornell University.

Lyrics

Notes
 The line "Bless the College of our boyhood" in the Alma Mater was changed to "Bless the College of our fathers" in the 1928–1929 student handbook. Additionally, there were discussions and contests to change the Alma Mater in 1941 and circa 1959.

References

External links
College of William & Mary choir
Virtual Alma Mater by W&M Choir and choral students and alumni

College of William & Mary student life
American college songs
Alma mater songs